Gøsta af Geijerstam (22 August 1888 – 20 August 1954, also Gösta, Gustaf) was a Swedish-Norwegian author and painter.

His family moved from Stockholm to Dale, Sogn og Fjordane in 1905, where he spent most of his life. He studied in  Munich, Paris and Berlin, and settled in Norway permanently in 1913, in which year he also married singer Astri Smith.

He debuted in with sketches of hunting scenes, in Krigare och Björnjägare ("warriors and bear-hunters", 1916), followed by  Finska bataljonen ("Finnish battalion", 1922) and  Ormgutten, Roald og jeg (1922). His novels Inger (1924),  Iva Storgaarden (1926) and  Hulder-Berret (1928) depicted the life of farmers in Gudbrandsdalen.  He published an autobiography,   Ongene og vi to i Storevik, in 1937.

His paintings and drawings are distinctly romantic, with a mood of mystery and magic. 
He illustrated several books, and he was commissioned for the decoration of the Catholic churches of 
Haugesund, Tromsø and Trondheim.

His friendship with author Sigrid Undset was documented by his daughter, Sunniva af Geijerstam Hagenlund (b. 1929) in a 1994 publication.

References
Svenskt konstnärslexikon, vol. 2,  Malmö, 1952, pp. 276–77.
 H. Vollmer, Allgemeines Lexikon der bildenden Künstler des XX Jahrhunderts, Leipzig, 1955, Vol. 2, p. 218.
Glenny Alfsen, "Gøsta Af Geijerstam" in Norsk kunstnerleksikon (1982/6). 
Morten Moi, "Gösta af Geijerstam" in  Store norske leksikon.
Sunniva af Geijerstam Hagenlund, Portrett av et vennskap, Oslo: Aschehoug forlag (1994).

External links
digitaltuseum.no

1888 births
1954 deaths
Artists from Stockholm
Swedish emigrants to Norway
Norwegian male writers
19th-century Norwegian painters
19th-century male artists
20th-century Norwegian painters